Joe Crowley is an English television presenter and broadcast journalist, best known for presenting and reporting on The One Show and Countryfile as well as co-presenting the factual BBC One series Holiday Hit Squad since 2013, alongside Angela Rippon and Helen Skelton.

Early life
Crowley grew up in Norwich, Norfolk, and gained a degree in history at Magdalene College, Cambridge University, and a post-graduate diploma in broadcast journalism from City University London.

Career
In his early career, Crowley worked for Inside Out South, which saw him nominated as 'Young Journalist of the Year' at the National RTS awards and earned him the 'Regional TV Personality of the Year' title at the RTS Southern Awards.

Crowley is currently a reporter for the BBC One magazine show The One Show. In 2011, 2012 and 2016, he guest hosted The One Show for a few episodes.

Crowley presented Country Tracks from 2009 until 2011, three series of Britain's Empty Homes and Britain's Empty Homes Revisited from 2012 until 2014, Turn Back Time in 2012, and Save My Holiday in 2011.

In 2012, with Suzannah Lipscomb, Crowley presented three episodes of Bloody Tales of the Tower for National Geographic (American TV channel), followed in 2013 by eight episodes of Bloody Tales of Europe.

He co-presented two series of the factual BBC One programme Holiday Hit Squad with Angela Rippon and Helen Skelton. He narrated the Animal Frontline and the Helicopter Heroes Down Under series in 2013.

In 2014, Crowley co-presented the Channel 5 series Police 5 with Kate McIntyre. In 2015 he joined the popular Sunday evening BBC One programme Countryfile

Charity
Crowley is a supporter of The Anthony Nolan Trust and ran the 2014 London Marathon for the charity.

References

External links
Official Twitter
The One Show profile page
Inside Out profile page

English television presenters
English male journalists
Living people
Media personalities from Norwich
Alumni of Magdalene College, Cambridge
Alumni of City, University of London
Place of birth missing (living people)
Year of birth missing (living people)